Academic journals are peer-reviewed periodicals that publish research papers. A variety of academic journals publish accounting and auditing research.

Publishing in leading accounting journals affects many aspects of an accounting researcher's career, including reputation, salary, and promotion. Empirical studies suggest that publishing in leading accounting journals tends to be more difficult than in other business disciplines. In some universities, the number of articles a faculty member publishes in top journals is the key measure of his or her research performance. Publishing research in a top journal is generally seen as a significant achievement that demonstrates that the research was recognized by the authors' peers as having significant impact. Additionally, articles in leading accounting journals influence subsequent research, and are often used in training accounting PhD students.

Various methods have been used to determine the leading accounting journals, including surveys of faculty members, and methods based on the number of times the journals' articles were cited. In the 1960s, Eugene Garfield invented the impact factor, a tool for ranking and evaluating journals. A journal's impact factor for a given year is the average number of citations per article published in the preceding two years. Recent studies on accounting research and on doctoral programs in accounting considered the six leading accounting journals to be Accounting, Organizations and Society, The Accounting Review, Contemporary Accounting Research, the Journal of Accounting and Economics, the Journal of Accounting Research and the Review of Accounting Studies.

Accounting journals

Notes

References

Accounting research
Accounting